Southport–Burleigh Road is a road in the city of Gold Coast in the Australian state of Queensland. It is designated as State Route 3 and runs  from Southport to Burleigh Heads. It includes four former suburban streets, which are still known locally by their original names. They are (from north to south):
 High Street
 Ferry Road
 Bundall Road
 Bermuda Street

It is a state-controlled district road (number 103).

High Street
High Street starts at an intersection with Stevens Street and runs south-west to North Street, where it turns south-east and becomes part of Southport-Burleigh Road. It continues through the Southport CBD until it reaches Queen Street, where it becomes Ferry Road.

Major intersections
The road is in the Gold Coast local government area.

See also

 List of road routes in Queensland
 List of numbered roads in Queensland

References

Roads on the Gold Coast, Queensland
Southport, Queensland
Burleigh Heads, Queensland